Glenoleon falsus is a species of antlion that occurs in Australia.

References

External links 

Myrmeleontidae
Insects of Australia
Insects described in 1853